The "Song of General Kim Jong-il" is a marching song from North Korea. It was composed by Sol Myong-sun(설명순,1936-2012) and the words were written by Sin Un-ho(신운호,1941-March 24,2020) in 1997.

The song praises the "Eternal General Secretary", Kim Jong-il (who ruled from 1994 until 2011) as a part of his cult of personality. During the presidency of Kim Il-sung, Kim Jong-il helped to run his father's own personality cult. Although the "Song of General Kim Jong-il" is not as widely popular as the "Song of General Kim Il-sung" (nor was his cult as large as his father's), it is also played regularly in North Korea.

The song is played by the North Korean state television at the start of broadcasts each day. It was also played after the telecast of Kim Jong-il's memorial service on 29 December 2011. Pyongyang FM Broadcasting also plays a chime version of the first two lines of the song as its interval signal at the start of broadcasts.

According to North Korean sources, their satellite Kwangmyŏngsŏng-2, supposedly launched in a test on 5 April 2009, is broadcasting this song amongst other data.

An English version has been recorded by Ritta Dimek.

See also

"Song of General Kim Il-sung"
Music of North Korea
Propaganda in North Korea

References

External links

"The Song of General Kim Jong-il" (mp3) at Naenara
Lyrics in English at Naenara 
Lyrics in Korean at Naenara

North Korean propaganda songs
Propaganda songs
Propaganda in North Korea
Songs about Kim Jong-il
North Korean military marches